In United States agricultural policy, Historic peanut producers are those producers who were actively involved in planting and harvesting peanuts in the 1998-2001 period. Under the 2002 farm bill (P.L. 107-171, Sec. 1301-1310), only these historic producers are eligible to receive fixed direct payments and counter-cyclical payments under the new peanut program, irrespective of whether or not they continue to produce peanuts. Payments made to these producers are based on past production on historical acreage.

See also
Peanut Price Support Program

References 

United States Department of Agriculture
Peanuts